

Minsar or Moincêr is a village and the centre of a township in the Ngari Prefecture of the Tibet region of China. It is legally an enclave of India in Tibet, occupied by China since 1959.

Minsar is located south-west of Mount Kailash (Mount Ti-se). It is close to the Tirthapuri Monastery on the bank of the Sutlej River. The Chines National Highway G219 passes by Minsar.

History 
Prior to the Tibet–Ladakh–Mughal War (1679–1684), the Kingdom of Ladakh controlled the whole of the Ngari region (present day western Tibet). Central Tibet, consolidated by the Fifth Dalai Lama,  conquered and occupied Ngari, but was driven back from Ladakh proper by the forces of the Mughal Empire from Kashmir. Lhasa sent the sixth Drukchen from Bhutan, Gyalwang Mipham Wangpo to negotiate truce terms with Ladakh. In the resulting Treaty of Tingmosgang, Ladakh agreed to cede the whole of western Tibet to Lhasa retaining only a tract around Minsar for supporting the worship at Mount Kailas. 

Minsar appears to have been used for porterage for the Ladakhi trade caravans to Tibet.

Economy 
Minsar depends on its small coal-mining industry; from which it once produced large amounts of ore from its nearby mines. The village is small and its villagers live depending heavily on yaks for agriculture and trade.

Gallery

Notes

References

Bibliography

See also
List of towns and villages in Tibet

Populated places in Ngari Prefecture
Township-level divisions of Tibet